Tabitha Brown may refer to:
Tabitha Moffatt Brown (1780–1858), American pioneer
Tabitha Brown (actress) (born 1979), American actress and social media personality